James Duncan Keene (born 26 December 1985) is an English former footballer who played as a striker.

Club career

Early career 
Keene is a product of the Portsmouth youth scheme. After making his way through the ranks – including a successful 'work experience' loan at A.F.C. Newbury – he was loaned to Football League Two club Kidderminster Harriers, making his debut in a 2–0 defeat to Bristol Rovers. Keene was the Man of the Match for the visitors. He played five more games for Kidderminster, excelling during his loan period.

He was rewarded upon his return to Fratton Park with his first professional contract, to run until the summer of 2007.

Following his loan he broke into the first team squad, and played in the final two games of the 2004–05 season, making his debut against Bolton Wanderers in a 1–1 draw as a 60th-minute substitute. He started his next game against West Bromwich Albion. He then had two loans spells in the 2005–06 season. First he joined League 1 side AFC Bournemouth. It was there he scored his first career goal on 15 October 2005, a last minute winner as Bournemouth beat Colchester away from home by the single goal. Three days later he scored twice in a 4–1 win over Aldershot Town in the Football League Trophy. His fourth and final goal for the club came in a 2-0 league victory against Brentford. He then joined League 2 side Boston United, where he scored his first and only goal for the club in a 1–1 draw with Rochdale.

Sweden 
Keene was loaned in March 2006 to GAIS for the Swedish 2006 Allsvenskan. Keene scored the first goal of the season for GAIS in the Allsvenskan in the Gothenburg derby against Örgryte IS. He finished the season as the club's top scorer with 10 goals in 24 league appearances, and following his success he was at the end of the season transferred to the Swedish champions IF Elfsborg, signing a five-year contract with them. Keene has been an integral member of the club's Champions League campaigns.

Keene was on loan to the Norwegian Tippeligaen team Fredrikstad FK during the latter part of the 2011 season. He then returned to Elfsborg, and was loaned to Djurgården for 2012 season.

Keene has recently become a Swedish citizen and Is fluent in the language.

Return to Portsmouth 
On 10 January 2013, Keene signed a one-month loan deal with Portsmouth, his former club. He made his debut on 26 January, against Hartlepool United. He scored his first Pompey goal on 2 February, against Colchester United. He returned to Elfsborg on 2 March, after the game against Crewe Alexandra, in which Portsmouth managed to get a win.

Return to Sweden 
On 24 April 2015, Keene joined Allsvenskan side Halmstad.

Bidvest Wits 
On 1 January 2016, Bidvest Wits of the South African Premier Division announced that Keene had signed for them. On 14 May 2018, it was announced that he would join SuperSport United for the 2018–19 season.

In July 2019, Keene returned to Sweden once again to sign for Superettan side Öster.

International career 
Uncapped by England, Keene expressed his interest in playing for the Swedish national football team He became eligible in 2012.

Career statistics

Honours 
Individual
 Årets Järnkamin: 2012.

Bidvest Wits
 Premier Soccer League:2016–17
Mtn 8:2016
Telkom Knockout:2017-18

External links

References 

1985 births
Living people
People from Wells, Somerset
English footballers
Association football forwards
Premier League players
Portsmouth F.C. players
Kidderminster Harriers F.C. players
AFC Bournemouth players
Boston United F.C. players
NorthEast United FC players
English expatriate footballers
Expatriate footballers in Sweden
Expatriate footballers in Norway
Expatriate footballers in Israel
Expatriate footballers in India
Expatriate soccer players in South Africa
Allsvenskan players
Israeli Premier League players
Indian Super League players
GAIS players
English expatriate sportspeople in Sweden
English expatriate sportspeople in Norway
English expatriate sportspeople in Israel
English expatriate sportspeople in India
English expatriate sportspeople in South Africa
IF Elfsborg players
Djurgårdens IF Fotboll players
Halmstads BK players
Fredrikstad FK players
Eliteserien players
Bidvest Wits F.C. players
SuperSport United F.C. players
South African Premier Division players
English Football League players
Östers IF players
Superettan players